Marceli Jasiński (Russian Марцелий Антонович Ясинський; 1837 – d. 1867) was Polish composer and music critic residing in Ukraine. He published several articles and music pieces in Józef Sikorski's weekly magazine Ruch muzyczny under pseudonym Józef Doroszenko. He also worked for Telegraf Kijowski. His reviews were about music in regions of Volhynia, Podolia and Ukraine.

Jasiński composed at least two ballets. The first was Pan Twardowski (a Polish folklore sorcerer) in 5 parts, staged in Kiev in 1860. The other was Cień. His other works were songs, piano and orchestral pieces. His Dumka for violin or basolia with piano was recently republished.

References

External links 
 
 Scores by Marceli Jasiński in digital library Polona

1867 deaths
Polish Romantic composers
Polish composers
1837 births